Augusto González Besada (June 14, 1865 – June 4, 1919) was a Spanish lawyer and politician who served as President of the Congress of Deputies, Minister of Finance, Minister of the Interior and Minister of Development during the reign of King Alfonso XIII.

Biography 

González Besada was member of one of the most powerful families of the Province of Pontevedra. His father, as well as his uncles, were members of the Provincial Deputation of Pontevedra, and one of his uncles, Sabino, was President of the Deputation from 1896 to 1898 and Civil Governor of Pontevedra in two occasions.

After obtaining the bachelor's degree, he entered in the University of Santiago de Compostela where he studied law obtaining the degree in 1885. He started his professional work in the Bar Association of Pontevedra where he obtained a lot of fame and later in Madrid.

Member of the Conservative Party, he was elected MP in 1899 by the constituency of Pontevedra and he was re-elected in the elections of 1901, 1903 and 1905. In the next electoral processes, González Besada was elected by the constituencies of Cádiz in 1907, Almeria in 1910, Alicante in 1914 and Lugo in 1916 and 1919.

In 1902 he was appointed Under Secretary of Finance and he was promoted to Minister of Finance from July 20, 1903, to December 5, 1903, by prime minister Raimundo Fernández Villaverde, being the youngest Finance Minister of the Restoration. He also held this portfolio in two more occasions: between September 14, 1908, and October 21, 1909, and in 1918, both occasions in the cabinets of Antonio Maura.

With Fernández Villaverde again as premier, González Besada was appointed Interior Minister from January 27 to June 23, 1905, and again with Maura, Development Minister from January 25, 1907, to September 14, 1908.

He was one of the spokespersons of the conservative opposition in the Congress of Deputies, an opposition that rejected the Consumables Substitution Act planned by José Canalejas and he announced that when the conservatives return to power, they would block that law, as it happened.

As Minister of Development he focused his forces on improving the Asturian ports of Ribadesella, Villaviciosa y Gijón as well as the repopulation of the rivers of that area but, above all, the Asturian region named him honorary citizen of the region because of his support to the railway project of the region.

He was elected President of the Congress of Deputies for the first time on April 3, 1914. He was elected by 285 votes of the 286 possibles and he was elected as an acting president. The House confirmed his election on April 28, 1914, by unanimity. He was re-elected again on November 11, 1915, for a second term by 255 votes of 257. In December, after the fall of the Cabinet of Eduardo Dato, the King proposed him to form a new government but he rejected it because that proposal was limited to be a temporary prime minister and without the authority to dissolve the Cortes and call for elections. In spite of rejecting the offer, González Besada became a great advisor to the government and the monarch.

In 1915, Maura nominated him as a member of the Spanish Royal Academy and he assumed in May 1916. He was also a member of the Royal Academy of Moral and Political Sciences, and of the Royal Academy of Jurisprudence of which he became president.

On June 4, 1919, three days after the being elected in the general election, González Besada passed away. He would be replaced as MP by his son Carlos González Besada y Giráldez. Two years later, to honor his memory, King Alfonso XIII created the Marquessate of González Besada, in favor of his widow.

References 

1865 births
1919 deaths
Presidents of the Congress of Deputies (Spain)
19th-century Spanish politicians
20th-century Spanish politicians
Members of the Royal Spanish Academy
Economy and finance ministers of Spain
Interior ministers of Spain
Public works ministers of Spain
People from O Baixo Miño